The Erste Deutsche Evangelische Kirche, also known as First United Church of Christ, is located at 160 Madison Avenue, Elmira, New York.  Construction of the church started in 1898, and finished the following year.  The church served the large German American population of Elmira.  It is significant for its Rhenish Romanesque architecture.  The church and its parsonage were listed on the National Register of Historic Places in 2007.

Gallery

References

External links
Website of First United Church of Christ of Elmira

Churches on the National Register of Historic Places in New York (state)
Churches completed in 1898
19th-century United Church of Christ church buildings
United Church of Christ churches in New York (state)
Romanesque Revival church buildings in New York (state)
Churches in Chemung County, New York
Buildings and structures in Elmira, New York
1898 establishments in New York (state)
National Register of Historic Places in Chemung County, New York